Nduka Anyanwu (April 15, 1980 – September 12, 2010) was a Nigerian footballer.

Anyanwu, who played in defence or midfield, was based in Germany for almost all of his career, having joined Eintracht Frankfurt as a 17-year-old along with a number of his compatriots. He died on the pitch in September 2010 while playing for SV Geinsheim.

Honours
Oberliga Nordost (IV): 2002
Oberliga Südwest (IV): 2007

References

1980 births
2010 deaths
Nigerian footballers
Association football defenders
Association football midfielders
Eintracht Frankfurt II players
Chemnitzer FC players
Dynamo Dresden players
SV Darmstadt 98 players
FSV Oggersheim players
Association football utility players
Association football players who died while playing
Union Bank F.C. players
Sport deaths in Germany